is a Japanese left-handed volleyball player. Currently, he plays for JTEKT Stings in V.League Division 1.

Nishida made his debut with JTEKT Stings at V.League on 6 January 2018 in a match against Osaka Blazers Sakai. His impressive debut at the young age of 17 soon earned him a position in JTEKT's Starting 6, as well as Japan men's national volleyball team. Nishida also led the team finishing 7th place after 29 years, in the 2020 Tokyo Olympics.

Nishida is one of the youngest players in the 2018 roster of the Japan men's national volleyball team and FIVB cup Final. He made his first international performance with the Japanese national team in 2018 FIVB Volleyball Men's Nations League. In June 2018, he played a pivotal role in securing Japan's first win in 11 years against Italy where he collected 24 points from 21 spikes and 3 aces. In September 2018, in a match against Argentina in 2018 FIVB Volleyball Men's World Championship, Nishida became the youngest player ever to score 30 points in a match. In June 2019, Nishida broke serving records in the VNL history after hitting 7 aces in a single game during a match against Canada.

Nishida transferred to play for Volley Callipo in the Italian Volleyball League for the 2021–22 season. He received MVP of the match awards thrice in spite of an injury and subsequent 2-month recovery. Nishida would become the highest scorer of his team, with a personal one-match record of 29 points, and held the record for the most aces in one match during the league's first round of the 2021/22 season with 8 aces.

Career

Elementary school years
Nishida first started volleyball due to his elder sister and brother and joined the same team as his brother 'Daian Beetles'. 

While being fascinated by the Olympics, his attention was caught by Kunihiro Shimizu, a left-handed opposite like him which instigated and inspired him to want to be like Shimizu and compete in the Olympics.

In his fourth year of elementary school, Nishida achieved a huge goal of winning the 29th All Japan Volleyball Tournament in Mie Prefecture.

In his sixth year of elementary school, he became the captain and led the team to win the President's Cup of Mie Prefecture Club Volleyball Federation

Middle School Years
After graduation, he went to a local junior high (middle school) which was not a powerhouse.

Nishida had the opportunity to participate in 's volleyball club practice in Yokkaichi, Mie Prefecture as he was a regular player since freshman year. His play there caught the attention of Masanobu Onishi, the volleyball team manager at that time, and Katsunari Fujita, the head of the team. In June of the same year, he joined the junior high school club team 'NFO Ocean Star', recommended by Fujita.

In March 2013, Nishida was selected for the U-14 team in the Hokusei district of Mie Prefecture. In August of the same year, he was selected for the Mie Prefecture selection team and competed with teams from all over Japan in the Junior Olympic cup held in December.

High school years
He chose to decline the powerhouses in his prefectures and chose to go to Kaisei High School which had never been to nationals.   He later joined the newly established U-19 of the local club team Veertian Mie. In June, they won the U-19 boys division of the Mie Prefecture Young Volleyball Championship, and in September, they won the national championship. Nishida received the Japan Young Club Volleyball Federation Award as an outstanding player in that tournament.

Just as he had done in junior high school, Nishida practiced with three different teams and went on to compete in the Mie Prefectural High School Championship (Haruko Preliminaries) in November.

Career and Japan national team

2017/18 season
In March 2017, Nishida had a name in Japan men's national under-19 volleyball team for competed in 2017 Asian Boys' U19 Volleyball Championship. In October 2017, He joined club JTEKT Stings.

Nishida's V.League debut was on January 6, 2018, in a match against Sakai Blazers. Nishida received the Wakawashi Award in Kurowashiki All Japan Volleyball Tournament which is the Rookie of the Year award.

2018/19 season
He was called up to the Senior National team for the first time in April of age at 18. Nishida made his senior national team debut on May 25, 2018, in his first Nations League match in Rouen, France. He was named a starter in that match against Australia.

Then, in September, he competed in the 2018 FIVB Volleyball Men's World Championship, jointly hosted by Italy and Bulgaria. Nishida had a minor foot injury and missed the first match with Italy. 

In the V.League 2018–19 season, along with Nishida, the other candidate was Issei Otake from Panasonic Panthers, who won that season's Rookie of the Year.

2019/20 Season
In April 2019, Yuji Nishida was selected to represent Japan for the second year in a row. 

The following October, the 2019 FIVB Volleyball Men's World Cup was held in Japan. He was awarded "Best Server" and "Best Opposite" for his impressive performance.

Nishida went on to lead his team to their first V.League title. Nishida ranked as "High scorer" and "Serve Effectiveness Rate," which were fixed at the end of the regular round, as well as MVP.

2020/21 season
In February 2020, Nishida had a name in 2020 Japan's national team roster. 

December 2020, in the Japanese Emperor's Cup, JTEKT Stings finished at the 1st place of the competition by defeated Panasonic Panthers in 3–1 set.

2021/22 season 
On April 5, 2021, Japan Volleyball Association (JVA) announced the Japanese national team roster for Year 2021, Nishida was in the roster. 

In the "2021 Volleyball Men's National Team Red and White Match", which is a competing between Japanese national team themselves, Nishida had a name in starting player of the red team. In the early of the first set, Nishida's right ankle was injured after he landed from blocking, he couldn't walk by himself so he was carried from the court and was taken to the hospital. After an X-ray scan, the head coach of the team reported that Nishida had no fractures and had been diagnosed with a sprain on the right ankle. 

Nishida had the name in the 2021 FIVB Volleyball Men's Nations League Japanese team roster, the competition would be held in Rimini, Italy, although he had not fully recovered. He was back in the third week of the tournament, in the game with Poland, as a substitute and returned to the starting line up in the match against Bulgaria.

On June 21, Japan Volleyball Association announced the Japanese team roster for 2020 Tokyo Olympics, Nishida had a name as one of the opposite hitters. He became the first player of the 2020 Tokyo Olympics to break the 30–point scoring mark in the men event and was the tenth player, and first Japanese, since the introduction of the rally scoring system.

On August 9, Nishida had official announcement that he would transfer to play in Italian Volleyball League for Volley Callipo club in the 2021–22 season.

On November 22, in the match against Volley Lube, he injured his left calf at the early of second set, which took him out of the court. 

Nishida recovered for about 2 months and absent from the court for many matches. He came back, on mid-January. 

In March 2022, it was reported that after the end of the season, Nishida will return to play in his domestic league.

2022/23 season 
On April 4, 2022, Japan Volleyball Association (JVA) announced the 2022 Japanese roster for competing in Nations League, Asian Games and World Championship. Nishida had the name among 35-player roster after he didn't join the team in 2021 Asian Men's Volleyball Championship tournament last year, due to his preparation for Italian league and the injury. His national team jersey number changed from No.11 to No.1.

On June 1, JTEKT Stings announced that Nishida would join the club again for Season 2022–23.

At the Nations League, Nishida scored the highest of the Japanese team and the third of the league's first round with 201 points, including 162 attacks, 10 blocks and 29 aces. He delivered 28 points for winning Italy with the full-set match on June 24, 2022. At the end of the preliminary round, Japan advanced to the quarterfinals after placed 5th. Then, Japanese team was scheduled to face with France which they lost with 3–0 set, making Japanese team ended at 5th place in the final standing.

On August 26, Japanese team first played in 2022 World Championship against Qatar which the team won in a straight set. Nishida contributed for 17 points, including 4 blocks. In the next two games, Japanese team faced with Brazil and Cuba that they lost and won, respectively. Resulting the Japan advanced to the final round since many years. They have managed to fought against France, the 2020 Olympic and the Nations League gold medalists. In the game, Nishida scored total 31 points, which the most in the game. They played in the full set but Nishida's team was lost, making them finished at the 12th place.

He was away from the court for three weeks after the V.League had started two weeks earlier. He had a high fever that never went away. He didn't know what caused the situation after medical checks. He was treated as infected with incurable diseases. Nishida started to think about whether he would be able to play volleyball anymore. Fortunately, all the symptoms simply disappeared and Nishida was told that he could play volleyball again. He was able to lead his team to win the 2022 Emperor's Cup title.

Awards

Individuals 
2018–19 V.League 1 — Rookie of the Year
2018–19 V.League 1 — Best Server 
2019 Asian Men's Volleyball Championship — Best Server
2019 FIVB Volleyball Men's World Cup — Best Opposite Spiker
2019–20 V.League 1 — Most Valuable Player
2019–20 V.League 1 — Best Scorer
2019–20 V.League 1 — Best Server
2019–20 V.League 1 — Best Opposite Spiker
2019–20 V.League 1 — Best 6
2020–21 the Japanese Emperor's Cup — Most Valuable Player 
2020–21 V.League 1 — Best Server
2020–21 V.League 1 — V.League Japan record award player, highest score from Japanese player in the history (with 833 points)

Club teams 
2019–20 V.League 1 —  Champion, with JTEKT Stings
2020–21 the Japanese Emperor's Cup —  Champion, with JTEKT Stings
2022 Emperor's Cup —  Champion, with JTEKT Stings

Junior national team 
 2017 Asian Boys' U19 Volleyball Championship —  Gold medal in Myanmar

National team 
 2019 Asian Men's Volleyball Championship —  Bronze medal in Iran

Personal life
Nishida started playing volleyball after watching his sister playing the sport. He listed watching movies and shopping as his hobbies. He has an elder sister 8 years older than him and a brother 6 years older than him. In an interview, he said his idol is Yūki Ishikawa, Masahiro Yanagida, Michal Kubiak and Hiroaki Asano. 

In 2020, there was announced that he would support Asics, a Japanese multinational corporation which produces sports equipment, through product promotions and advertisement.

In October 2021, it was announced that Nishida had signed a partnership with CLEVER, Japanese protein brand. 

He started his own Youtube Channel on December 6, 2020, it surpassed 100,000 subscribers in six months. Nishida established his personal apparel's brand, Crazy Jump, which was launched to the public in August, 2022. 

On December 31, 2022, Nishida announced through his Instagram that he had married Sarina Koga.

References

External links
 Official website

 Japan's Nishida Yuji on high trajectory to Tokyo 2020 at olympic.com
 西田有志に備わった強烈スパイク、サーブだけじゃない武器とは？ at number.bunshun.jp
 Tokyo Olympics: Yuji Nishida putting his body on the line for Japan at The Times of India
 西田有志が振り返る東京五輪ベスト8とブラジル戦の涙、愛着あるジェイテクトを離れイタリアへ「常識にとらわれたくない at number.bunshun.jp 
 西田有志のイタリア挑戦は背番号「２」でスタート。バルドヴィン監督「４選手の獲得は我々の念願だった」 at Yahoo! Japan
 男子バレー西田有志がセリエＡで新たなスタート。それでも「海外だけが正解じゃない」と話す理由 at sportiva.shueisha
 日本バレーが28年ぶりの4位と躍進。２つの武器が好調の要因だった at sportiva.shueisha
 Tonno Callipo, altro test utile con Perugia a 8 giorni dall’esordio a Taranto at Volley Callipo
 「レベルの高さに衝撃を受けている」イタリア初挑戦の西田有志が近況を報告！「新しいことばかり」 at Yahoo! Japan
 「Vリーグは時代に逆行している」。西田有志が語る、イタリアに見習うべき日本バレー界の改善点 at Yahoo! Japan

2000 births
Living people
Japanese men's volleyball players
Sportspeople from Mie Prefecture
Volleyball players at the 2020 Summer Olympics
Olympic volleyball players of Japan
Opposite hitters